Whitchurch Bridge is a toll bridge that carries the B471 road over the River Thames in England. It links the villages of Pangbourne in Berkshire, and Whitchurch-on-Thames in Oxfordshire – crossing the river just downstream of Whitchurch Lock. It is one of two remaining private toll bridges across the Thames, the other being Swinford Toll Bridge. The bridge has a weight limit of 7.5 tonnes and is a Grade II listed structure. Its 1792-built, now unrelated, residential toll house is also listed.

The bridge is owned and maintained by The Company of Proprietors of Whitchurch Bridge, who are themselves owned by the General Estates Company, who also own Bathampton Toll Bridge across the River Avon to the east of Bath. Tolls currently range from 60p for cars to £4 for vehicles of over 3.5 tonnes. Pedestrians, cyclists and motorcycles cross for free. A pre-paid multiple-use Bridge Card can be bought that provides cost savings on tolls.

The Thames Path crosses the river on Whitchurch Bridge. In the downstream (easterly) direction the path passes along the southern bank of the Thames through Pangbourne Meadow. In the upstream (westerly) direction it takes a more inland route through Hartslock on the north side of the river.

History 
A bridge has stood here since 1792 when it replaced a ferry. The structure was renewed in 1852–3, 1902 and most recently in 2014. Horses and persons using the lock for barge hauling were exempt.

The Company of Proprietors of Whitchurch Bridge was promoted by a consortium of ten subscribers, and was authorised by the Whitchurch Bridge Act 1792. Under this act, and the Whitchurch Bridge Act 1988, it has a duty to maintain the bridge "forever in good and sufficient repair" and to replace it if it becomes unsafe. In November 2008 the owners' predicted a renewal was vital within a decade and so announced application to the Department for Transport to double the toll for cars to 40p. This met with more local opposition than registered support. A public inquiry was held in June 2009 and the toll increase was approved in October 2009; the new toll came into force on 26 October 2009.

From October 2013 a complete reconstruction took place, with new and stronger piling and steel spans. The white lattice iron girders of the 1902 structure were refurbished and incorporated in the design. The contractor was Balfour Beatty, the designer Atkins and the project manager Oxfordshire County Council. During reconstruction the bridge was closed to vehicles, but a temporary footbridge was provided. The project was delayed for several months by exceptional flood flows in the Thames and the new bridge was finally opened on 19 September 2014. A blessing ceremony was conducted five days later by the Bishop of Oxford, during which a 1902 De Dion-Bouton was driven across the bridge, carrying Bridge Company directors and a descendant of one of the original bridge promoters of 1792.

As a result of the delays and consequent overspend on the reconstruction, the company proposed a further toll increase and a public enquiry was held on 19 May 2015. It considered 293 written objections but approved the request to increase tolls to 60p for cars and £4 for vehicles weighing more than 3.5 tonnes, on 12 August. In 2019 it was announced that the Company of Proprietors of Whitchurch Bridge had been sold to the General Estates Company, who previously held a minority stake in the company since the late 1920s.

Gallery

See also 
Crossings of the River Thames

Notes and references

Footnotes

Citations

External links 

Whitchurch Bridge web page from Whitchurch-on-Thames village web site

Independent Archive of Official Whitchurch Bridge Documents and Accounts

Bridges in Berkshire
Bridges in Oxfordshire
Bridges completed in 1902
Bridges across the River Thames
Toll bridges in England
Grade II listed bridges
Grade II listed buildings in Berkshire
Grade II listed buildings in Oxfordshire